Andrew Kennedy (born 10 January 1975) is an English cricketer.  Kennedy is a right-handed batsman who bowls right-arm medium-fast.  He was born in Colchester, Essex.

Kennedy represented the Essex Cricket Board in 3 List A matches.  These came against the Sussex Cricket Board in the 1st round of the 2002 Cheltenham & Gloucester Trophy which was held in 2001, the Surrey Cricket Board in the 2nd round of the 2003 Cheltenham & Gloucester Trophy which was held in 2002, and against Essex in the 3rd round of the same competition which was played in 2003.  In his 3 List A matches, he scored 72 runs at a batting average of 24.00, with a high score of 27.  In the field he took 2 catches.  With the ball he took a single wicket at a cost of 37 runs.

He currently plays club cricket for Colchester and East Essex Cricket Club in the Essex Premier League.

References

External links
Andrew Kennedy at Cricinfo
Andrew Kennedy at CricketArchive

1975 births
Living people
Sportspeople from Colchester
English cricketers
Essex Cricket Board cricketers